Alanchi (or Alanchy) is a tiny village about 25 km from Nagercoil, the headquarters of Kanyakumari District, and about 45 km from Trivandrum, the capital of Kerala, India. The name "Alanchy" is derived from the Tamil words "Aalu" (Banyan tree) and "Anju" (Five), which the whole area was owned by Alanchi Tharavad family; hence the name. There are Coastal Villages in the North-west (Midaalam) and South-west (Kurumabanai).  Most of the people of Alanchy are  Nadars among them  99% are Roman Catholic Christians.

History
With a population of about 9,000 people, Alanchi is one of the smallest villages in India, however, the per capita income of the residents of the village is larger than many other villages of the nation. During the independence, Alanchi was a very poor village with very few houses and others living in huts. The primary occupation then was climbing palm trees and selling palm juices. Jaggery was also made out of those palm juices - a task carried out by the women of Alanchi.

Christianity set foot in Alanchy during the days of St. Francis Xavier, one of the missionaries of Catholic church, and hence 99% of the Alanchy people are Catholics. Still there is a belief among people of Alanchy that the Stone Cross, presently placed in the Church porch, was erected by St. Francis Xavier himself. The Catholic Church in Alanchy is 180 years old. The present Church is the third church and the patron Saint is rightfully St. Francis Xavier. 

There were great Vaithiyars and Varmanis (Native Physicians) whose contributions were immense for the health of people of Alanchy. The parish priests had contributed much for the development of Alanchy. Among them were Rev.Fr.Elias and Fr. Martin, Carmelite missionaries who lived in the late 19th century, responsible for the establishment of the first church in Alanchy.

In early 1950s,Rev. Fr. C. M. Hillary laid the foundation stone for the modern Alanchy of today. He encouraged education among children and tried hard to establish a school.

With expertise in building construction, the residents of Alanchi soon found opportunity in the then upcoming Middle Eastern  economy. People one after another flocked to the GCC countries of Oman, Bahrain, the UAE, Kuwait, Saudi Arabia and Qatar. By the 1990s Alanchi was completely transformed into a modern village with most of the houses having electricity and television - which was still a luxury in other villages across the country. The church was renovated and the modern flooring and ceiling add beauty to the church. The altar was renovated with rich arts and architecture and the renovated church was blessed By Bishop Peter Remigius on 17 the February 2020.

Religion 
Christianity is the primary religion of Alanchi. Almost all are Catholics, except for a few families of Hindus and Muslims. St. Francis Xavier had toured Alanchi and helped set up a small church which was the first known. Alanchi has a Catholic church dedicated to St. Francis Xavier and a nun's convent nearby.

References

External links
 "St.Francis Xavier's Church", St.Francis Xavier's Church, Alanchy.

Kanyakumari